Arnold Demos (born September 8, 1936 in Boston) is an American sprint canoer who competed in the early 1960s. He was disqualified in the repechage round of the C-2 1000 m event at the 1960 Summer Olympics in Rome.

References
Sports-reference.com profile

1936 births
Sportspeople from Boston
American male canoeists
Canoeists at the 1960 Summer Olympics
Living people
Olympic canoeists of the United States